Danny Alder, sometimes credited as Danny Allder, is a UK-based Australian film, television and theatre actor.

Education
He attended the Western Australian Academy of Performing Arts at the Edith Cowan University in Mount Lawley, Western Australia, and the Aboriginal Centre for the Performing Arts (http://www.acpa.net.au) in Brisbane.

Career
Alder worked consistently in Australia on both stage and screen in Brisbane, Queensland and Melbourne and decided to move to the UK in 2007.

Within a few weeks of arriving in the UK, he accepted the role of Fin on EastEnders (one episode; credited as Danny Allder).

Alder has since worked in France, Israel, Portugal and Italy appearing in a new comedy Ikea commercial set in a prison.

He has also appeared in several films including Blurred written by Stephen Davies and the Melbourne made horror film Damned by Dawn.

A Fistful of Snow
In 2009 Alder performed in his second one-man show, A Fistful of Snow, as part of the Brighton Festival Fringe in Brighton, England, for which he received an award for 2009 Best Male Performer from Latest 7, a weekly magazine covering the Brighton area.

A Fistful of Snow was then performed at the 2009 Edinburgh Festival Fringe in Edinburgh, Scotland, at C Venues. whilst Danny was also performing in "The Hotel" a concept theatre piece, written and directed by UK comedian and writer, Mark Watson.

Notes

External links
 castlesintheskyproductions.co.uk , Castle in the Sky Productions (provides information on A Fistful of Snow and has a biography of Alder)
  

Year of birth missing (living people)
Male actors from Melbourne
Australian expatriates in the United Kingdom
Australian male film actors
Australian male stage actors
Australian male television actors
English male film actors
English male stage actors
English male television actors
Living people
Edith Cowan University alumni
Male actors from Brisbane